John William FitzPatrick (born March 9, 2000) is an American football tight end for the Atlanta Falcons of the National Football League (NFL). He played college football at Georgia.

Early life and high school
FitzPatrick grew up in Atlanta, Georgia and attended Marist High School. He was rated a three-star recruit and committed to play college football at Georgia over offers from Alabama, UCLA, and Virginia.

College career
FitzPatrick redshirted his true freshman season. As a redshirt sophomore, he caught ten passes for 95 yards and one touchdown. FitzPatrick played in all 15 of Georgia's games with seven starts in his redshirt junior season, catching six passes for 83 yards as the Bulldogs won the 2022 College Football Playoff National Championship. He had played the majority of the season with fractures in both of his feet. After the end of the season, FitzPatrick declared that he would be entering the 2022 NFL Draft.

Professional career
FitzPatrick was selected with the 213th pick in the sixth round of the 2022 NFL Draft by the Atlanta Falcons. He was placed on injured reserve on September 1, 2022.

References

External links
 Atlanta Falcons bio
Georgia Bulldogs bio

2000 births
Living people
American football tight ends
Georgia Bulldogs football players
Players of American football from Atlanta
Atlanta Falcons players